Mahindra Hockey Stadium is a field hockey stadium at Mumbai, Maharashtra, India. It is the home of the Mumbai Marines of the World Series Hockey and Mumbai Magicians of the Hockey India League. It was also the home venue of the Maratha Warriors in the Premier Hockey League. The stadium was formerly known as the Bombay Hockey Association Stadium and hosted the 1982 Men's Hockey World Cup.

References
World Series Hockey - Mahindra Hockey Stadium

Sports venues in Mumbai
Field hockey venues in Maharashtra
Year of establishment missing